Tambourhinoceros is a Danish independent record label and Music publisher.

Background
The label was created by two members of the band Oh No Ono in 2009 as a way for the founders to show the "burning love we have for music (our releases as well as art and music)". Its first release was Kristen and Marie's debut EP in May 2010.

Tambourhinoceros became internationally known for its production of Danish indie pop band Treefight for Sunlight, which received positive ratings in both the US and the UK. On that band's debut album, A Collection of Vibrations for Your Skull, a song entitled "Tambourhinoceros Jam" was included, which is assumed to be a tribute to the record label. Since then the label has released internationally successful artists like Iceage, Palace Winter and Efterklang among others.

In 2011, Tambourhinoceros was awarded with a Gaffa Award for its contribution to the Danish music scene.

Whilst it is primarily a record label, Tambourhinoceros is also doing publishing, management, graphic design and web design for their artists.

Aske Zidore left the label in 2012, and since early 2013 Tue Kjerstein & Kristoffer Rom have been the managing directors.

In 2016 Tambourhinoceros was recognised as one of Europe's most inspiring young label and was selected by IMPALA and The Independent Echo for the FIVEUNDERFIFTEEN campaign.

Artists

 4 Guys from the Future
 Andrea Welz
 Annsofie Salomon
 August Rosenbaum
 Birthgiving Toad
 Blondage
 Cancer
 Communions
 Chorus Grant
 Crush
 CTM (Cæcilie Trier)
 Efterklang
 FCAN
 Grønflammeskoven
 Hooray for Earth
 Iceage
 Inner Garden vs Celeste
 Intet Altid
 IRAH
 Kala-OK
 Kirsten & Marie
 Molina
 Oh No Ono
 Palace Winter
 Pardans
 PRE-Be-UN
 Rangleklods
 Shout Wellington Air Force
 School of X
 Skammens vogn
 The Entrepreneurs
 The League of Extraordinary Gentlemen
 The New Spring
 Thulebasen
 Treefight for Sunlight

References

External links
Tambourhinoceros - Website

Danish record labels